Keishon Bean (born 19 February 2000) is a Bermudian international footballer who plays for Pembroke Hamilton Club, as a midfielder.

Career
Bean is currently playing football for Pembroke Hamilton Club.

He made his international debut for Bermuda in 2017.

References

2000 births
Living people
Bermudian footballers
Bermuda international footballers
PHC Zebras players
Association football midfielders
BAA Wanderers F.C. players
North Village Rams players